Reuben Senyo (born 26 November 1986 in Ghana) is a Ghanaian retired footballer.

India

An addition to Viva Kerala in advance of the 2009-10 I-League, Senyo stated that the atmosphere in Indian football was convivial and was predicted to have a great impact on Kerala. Burying two goals to come out on top over Sporting Clube de Goa 4-2 late 2009, he also got the winner to scrape past JCT 1-0 mid-January 2010.

References

External links 
 at Soccerway

1986 births
Living people
Ghanaian footballers
Bofoakwa Tano F.C. players
Association football forwards